Highway 103 can refer to multiple roads:

Belgium
  N103 (Belgium)

Canada
  New Brunswick Route 103
  Nova Scotia Provincial Highway 103
  Ontario Highway 103 (former)
 Prince Edward Island Route 103

China
  China National Highway 103

Costa Rica
 National Route 103

Croatia
 D103 road

India 
 National Highway 103 (India)

Ireland
 R103 road (Ireland)

Japan
 Japan National Route 103

Philippines
 N103 highway (Philippines)

South Africa
 R103 (South Africa)

United States
 Alabama State Route 103
 Arkansas Highway 103
 California State Route 103
 Colorado State Highway 103
 Connecticut Route 103
 Florida State Road 103
 County Road 103 (Duval County, Florida)
 Georgia State Route 103
 Illinois Route 103
 Indiana State Road 103
 Iowa Highway 103 (former)
 K-103 (Kansas highway)
 Kentucky Route 103
 Louisiana Highway 103
 Maine State Route 103
 Maryland Route 103
Maryland Route 103A
Maryland Route 103C
 Massachusetts Route 103
 M-103 (Michigan highway)
 Minnesota State Highway 103 (former)
 County Road 103 (Hennepin County, Minnesota)
 Missouri Route 103
 Nebraska Highway 103
 New Hampshire Route 103
 New Hampshire Route 103A
 County Route 103 (Ocean County, New Jersey)
 New Mexico State Road 103
 New York State Route 103
 County Route 103 (Albany County, New York)
 County Route 103 (Cayuga County, New York)
 County Route 103 (Cortland County, New York)
 County Route 103 (Dutchess County, New York)
 County Route 103 (Fulton County, New York)
 County Route 103 (Montgomery County, New York)
 County Route 103 (Onondaga County, New York)
 County Route 103 (Orleans County, New York)
 County Route 103 (Rensselaer County, New York)
 County Route 103 (Steuben County, New York)
 County Route 103 (Suffolk County, New York)
 County Route 103 (Sullivan County, New York)
 County Route 103 (Tompkins County, New York)
 County Route 103A (Tompkins County, New York)
 County Route 103B (Tompkins County, New York)
 County Route 103 (Wayne County, New York)
 County Route 103 (Westchester County, New York)
 North Carolina Highway 103
 Ohio State Route 103
 Oklahoma State Highway 103 (former)
 Oregon Route 103
 Pennsylvania Route 103
 Rhode Island Route 103
 Rhode Island Route 103A
 Tennessee State Route 103 
 Texas State Highway 103
 Texas State Highway Spur 103 (former)
 Farm to Market Road 103
 Utah State Route 103
 Vermont Route 103
 Virginia State Route 103
 Virginia State Route 103 (1928-1933) (former)
 Washington State Route 103
 West Virginia Route 103
 Wisconsin Highway 103

Territories
 Puerto Rico Highway 103

See also
A103
P103